The Northumberland Islands are a scattered island chain off the eastern coast of  Queensland, Australia.

Geography and history 
The Northumberland Islands are to the south-east of the city of Mackay roughly between the latitudes 21°S and 22°S. All islands are of the continental type. The island group was named by James Cook during his historic voyage along Australia's eastern seaboard in 1770, after the First Duke of Northumberland, Hugh Percy. Both Cook and Matthew Flinders make note of the island group in their journals, Cook describing them as such:

In 1855, a botany expedition led by naturalist Frederick Strange visited the islands on his ship Vision. Four of the expedition were killed by Aboriginal people at Middle Percy Island. Those killed were Frederick Strange and his assistant Richard Spinks, William Spurling (ship's mate) and Andrew Gittings (ship's cook and steward). Captain Chimmo of the Royal Navy vessel , sailed to the island and conducted an investigation. He decided to take ten of the islanders prisoner. These prisoners, including three women and three children, were sent to Sydney for trial. One child died in custody and the rest were eventually shipped back to Gladstone.

The island group is remote, and apart from charter flights to Marble Island they are accessible only by private yacht.

The Northumberland Islands are further subdivided into smaller groups: the Bedwell Group, Beverley Group, Broad Sound Islands, Duke Islands, Flat Isles, Guardfish Cluster and Percy Isles (within the locality The Percy Group). The islands are listed below, with the geographical coordinates of the largest islands given. Only the major islands of each group are listed.

Bedwell Group
Name origin: Staff Commander E. P. Bedwell, surveyor 
Calliope Island
Connor Islet
Innes Island
George Island
Poynter Island

Beverley Group
Name origin: Unknown 
Beverlac Island
Digby Island 
Double Island
Henderson Island
Hull Island
Keelan Island
Knight Island
Minster Island
Noel Island
Prudhoe Island

Broad Sound Islands

Name origin: Situated at the mouth of Broad Sound, a vast inlet named by Cook in 1770 
Long Island 
Quail Island
Tern Island
Wild Duck Island

Duke Islands

Name origin: Unknown 
Alnwick Island
Bamborough Island
Cheviot Island
Hexham Island 
High Peak Island 
Hunter Island
Marble Island 
Otterbourne Island
Shields Island
Steep Island
Tweed Island
Tynemouth Island

Flat Isles
Name origin: Named by Flinders in 1802 due to their height  - Avoid Island is the highest at 33 metres above sea level
Aquila Island 
Avoid Island
Flock Pigeon Island 
Red Clay Island

Guardfish Cluster
Name origin: Unknown 
Bluff Island
Curlew Island 
Tinonee Peak Island

Percy Isles

Name origin: Named by Flinders in 1802 after the Duke of Northumberland's family name 
Hotspur Island
Shrewsbury Rock
Middle Percy Island 
North East Island
Pine Islet
Pine Peak Island
South Percy Island
Sphinx Island
Walter Island

See also

 Northumberland Islands National Park

References

External links
Map of Mackay region, showing Northumberland Islands at bottom right

Islands of Queensland